The following outline is provided as an overview of and topical guide to Athens:

Athens – capital of Greece and of the Attica region. With 3,090,508 residents in 412 km2 (159 sq mi), it is also the country's most populated city. Athens is one of the world's oldest cities, with its recorded history spanning over 3,400 years.

General reference 
 Pronunciation:  ;  ;  
 Common English name(s): Athens
 Official English name(s): Athens
 Adjectival(s): Athenian
 Demonym(s): Athenian

Geography of Athens 

Geography of Athens
 Athens is:
 a city
 capital of Attica
 capital of Greece
 primate city of Greece
 Population of Athens: 3,090,508
 Area of Athens: 412 km2 (159 sq mi) 
 Atlas of Athens
 Topography of Athens

Location of Athens 

 Athens is situated within the following regions:
 Northern Hemisphere and Eastern Hemisphere
 Eurasia
 Europe (outline)
 Southern Europe
 Balkan peninsula
 Greece (outline)
 Central Greece
 Attica
 Central Athens
 Municipality of Athens
 Time zones:
 Eastern European Time (UTC+02)
 Eastern European Summer Time (UTC+03)

Environment of Athens 

 Climate of Athens

Natural geographic features of Athens 

 Hills in Athens
 Areopagus
 Mount Lycabettus
 Pnyx
 Skouze Hill
 Strefi Hill
 Rivers in Athens
 Cephissus
 Ilisos
 World Heritage Sites in Athens
 Acropolis of Athens
 Daphni Monastery

Areas surrounding Athens

Municipality of Athens 
Municipality of Athens

Areas of Athens

Neighborhoods in municipality of Athens 

 Aerides
 Agios Eleftherios
 Agios Panteleimonas
 Akadimia
 Akadimia Platonos
 Acropolis
 Ampelokipi
 Anafiotika
 Ano Petralona
 Asyrmatos
 Asteroskopeio
 Attiki
 Eleonas
 Ellinoroson
 Erythros Stavros

 Exarcheia
 Gazi
 Girokomeio
 Gyzi
 Goudi
 Gouva
 Ilisia
 Kallimarmaro
 Kato Petralona
 Keramikos
 Kolokynthou
 Kolonaki
 Kolonos
 Koukaki
 Kountouriotika

 Kypriadou
 Kypseli
 Kynosargous
 Makrygianni
 Metaxourgeio
 Mets
 Monastiraki
 Nea Filothei
 Neapoli
 Neos Kosmos
 Omonoia
 Pangrati
 Patisia
 Pedion tou Areos
 Petralona

 Philopappou
 Plaka
 Polygono
 Probonas
 Profitis Daniil
 Profitis Ilias
 Psyri
 Rizoupoli
 Rouf
 Sepolia
 Syntagma
 Thiseio
 Thymarakia
 Treis Gefyres
 Votanikos

Athens Metropolitan Area 

Athens Metropolitan Area
 Central Athens
 North Athens
 South Athens
 West Athens
 Piraeus
 East Attica
 West Attica

Athens Urban Area 
Athens Urban Area
 North Athens
 Central Athens
 South Athens
 West Athens
 Piraeus
 Part of East Attica
 Part of West attica

Locations in Athens 

 Tourist attractions
 Museums in Athens
 Shopping areas and markets

Ancient monuments in Athens 

 Acropolis
 Altar of the Twelve Gods
 Altar of Zeus Agoraios
 Ancient Agora
 Areopagus
 Aristotle's Lyceum 
 Dipylon
 Hadrian's Library
 Monument of Lysicrates
 Philopappos Monument
 Platonic Academy
 Remains of the Acharnian Road, Acharnian Gate and Cemetery Site
 Remains of the Long Walls
 Roman Agora
East Propylon
Gate of Athena Archegetis
 Tower of the Winds
 Sacred Gate
 Stoa of Attalos
 Themistoclean Walls
 Ancient temples in Athens 
 Erechtheion
 Parthenon
Older Parthenon
 Temple of Apollo Patroos
 Temple of Ares
 Temple of Athena Nike
 Temple of Hephaestus
 Temple of Olympian Zeus
 Ancient theatres
 Odeon of Herodes Atticus
 Theatre of Dionysus
 Ancient triumphal arches in Athens
 Arch of Hadrian

Churches in Athens 

 Cathedral Basilica of St. Dionysius the Areopagite
 Church of Saint Panteleimon of Acharnai
 Church of the Holy Apostles, Athens
 Metropolitan Cathedral of Athens

Cultural and exhibition centers in Athens 

 Athinais Cultural Center
 City of Athens Cultural Center
 Stavros Niarchos Foundation Cultural Center
 Zappeion

Monuments and memorials in Athens 

 Choragic Monument of Lysicrates
 Monument of the Eponymous Heroes
 Tomb of the Unknown Soldier

Museums in Athens 

 Acropolis Museum – opened in 2009, and replacing the old museum on the Acropolis, this museum has proved considerably popular; almost one million people visited during the summer period June–October 2009 alone. A number of smaller and privately owned museums focused on Greek culture and arts are also to be found.
 Benaki Museum – with a branch for each of its collections including ancient, Byzantine, Ottoman-era, and Chinese art and beyond
 Byzantine and Christian Museum – one of the most important museums of Byzantine art
 Epigraphical Museum
 Goulandris Museum of Contemporary Art
 Goulandris Museum of Cycladic Art
 Jewish Museum of Greece – its collection describes the history and culture of the Greek Jewish community.
 Kerameikos Archaeological Museum – displays artifacts from the burial site of Kerameikos.  Much of the pottery and other artifacts relate to Athenian attitudes towards death and the afterlife, throughout many ages.
 Municipal Gallery of Athens
 Museum of Cycladic Art – home to an extensive collection of Cycladic art, including its famous figurines of white marble
 Museum of Greek Folk Musical Instruments
 Museum of the City of Athens
 National Archaeological Museum – largest archaeological museum in the country, and one of the most important internationally. It contains a vast collection of antiquities, with artifacts covering a period of more than 5,000 years, from late Neolithic Age to Roman Greece.
 National Gallery
 National Historical Museum
 National Museum of Contemporary Art
 Numismatic Museum – houses a major collection of ancient and modern coins
 Syntagma Metro Station Archaeological Collection
 Athens War Museum

Palaces and villas in Athens 

 Old Royal Palace
 Presidential Mansion
 Stathatos Mansion

Parks and gardens in Athens 

 Attica Zoological Park
 Hellenikon Metropolitan Park
 National Gardens
 Pedion tou Areos

Public squares in Athens 

 Avdi Square
 Kolonaki Square
 Kotzia Square
 Monastiraki
 Omonoia Square
 Syntagma

Streets of Athens 

Streets in Athens
 Dionysiou Areopagitou Street
 Ermou Street
 Kifisias Avenue
 Panepistimiou Street
 Vasilissis Sofias Avenue
 Vouliagmenis Avenue

Demographics of Athens 

Demographics of Athens

Government and politics of Athens 

Administration of Athens
 Mayor of Athens

Law and order in Athens 
 Hellenic Police
 Presidential Guard

Military in Athens

History of Athens 

History of Athens

History of Athens, by period or event 

Timeline of Athens
 Athens during the Greek Dark Ages (c. 900 BC)
 Athens during the Archaic period (c. 800–480 BC)
 Rise of the polis
 Solonian Constitution (594 BC)

 Classical Athens during the Classical period (508–322 BC)
 Rise to power (508–448 BC)
 Fifth-century Athens
 Athenian democracy
 Greco-Persian Wars (499–449 BC)
 First Peloponnesian War (460–445 BC) 
 Athenian hegemony (448–430 BC) – the peak of Athenian hegemony was achieved in the 440s to 430s BC, known as the Age of Pericles.
 Peloponnesian War (431–404 BC)
 Plague of Athens (430 BC) 
 Athenian democracy was briefly overthrown by the coup of 411 BC.
 Corinthian War (395–387 BC)
 Athens under Macedon (355–322 BC)
 Hellenistic Athens during the Hellenistic period (323 BC–146 BC) 
 Roman Athens (146 BC–330 AD) – following the Battle of Corinth (146 BC), Greece was absorbed into the Roman Republic as part of the Achaea Province, concluding 200 years of Macedonian supremacy. Under Rome, Athens was given the status of a free city.
 Byzantine Athens
 Latin Athens
 Duchy of Athens (1204–1458)
 Ottoman Athens
 Greek War of Independence (1821–1829) Independence from the Ottomans
 Modern Athens
 Athens during the Greek Kingdom (1832–1924, 1935–1973) 
 Second Hellenic Republic (1924–1935)
 Athens during World War II
 Axis occupation of Greece
 Greek Resistance
 Dekemvriana
 Athens today

History of Athens, by subject 
 Battle of Athens (1941)
 Siege of the Acropolis (1821–22)
 Siege of the Acropolis (1826–27)

Culture of Athens 

Culture of Athens

Arts in Athens

Architecture of Athens 

Neoclassical architecture in Athens

 (Athenian Neoclassical Trilogy)
 Academy of Athens
 National Library of Greece
 University of Athens

Modern architecture in Athens
 Landscaping of the Acropolis of Athens
 Tallest buildings in Athens
Athens Towers

Literature of Athens 

 First Athenian School
 New Athenian School

Music of Athens 

Music of Athens
 Athens Concert Hall
 Athens Conservatoire
 National Conservatoire

Theatre of Athens 
Theatre in Athens
National Theatre of Greece
 National Theatre of Greece Drama School

Visual arts of Athens 
Athens in art / Paintings of Athens

Modern Greek art

Contemporary Greek art

Cuisine of Athens

Events in Athens
Athens Festival
Athens International Motor Show

Media in Athens
 Newspapers in Athens
Ta Nea
To Vima
 Radio in Athens
 Television in Athens
 
People from Athens
Athenians Project

Religion in Athens 

 Catholicism in Athens
Roman Catholic Archdiocese of Athens
 Greek Orthodoxy in Athens
 Archbishopric of Athens 
 Metropolitan Cathedral of Athens
 Islam in Athens
 Votanikos Mosque

Sports in Athens 

Sports in Athens
 Basketball in Athens
 AEK B.C.
 Acropolis International Basketball Tournament
 Football in Athens
 Athens Football Clubs Association
 AEK Athens F.C.
 A.O. Nea Ionia F.C.
 Apollon Smyrni F.C.
 Atromitos F.C.
 Panathinaikos F.C.
 Rugby football in Athens
 Athens RFC 
 Attica Springboks RFC
 Olympics in Athens
 Hellenic Olympic Committee
 1896 Summer Olympics
 2004 Summer Olympics
 Running in Athens
 Athens Classic Marathon
 Athens International Ultramarathon Festival
 Sports venues in Athens
 Athens Olympic Sports Complex
 Goudi Olympic Complex
 Hellinikon Olympic Complex
 Panathenaic Stadium

Economy and infrastructure of Athens 

Economy of Athens
 Financial services in Athens
National Bank of Greece
 Athens Stock Exchange
 Companies listed on the Athens Stock Exchange
 Hotels in Athens
Hilton Athens
Hotel Grande Bretagne
President Hotel Athens
 Restaurants in Athens

Tourism in Athens

Transportation in Athens 

Transportation in Athens
 Public transport in Athens
 Athens Mass Transit System
 Air transport in Athens
 Airports in Athens
 Athens International Airport

Rail transport in Athens 

Rail transport in Athens
 Commuter rail
 Athens Railway Station
Expansion of the Athens Railway Station
  Athens Metro
 
 
 
 
 List of Athens Metro stations
 Trams in Athens
 Athens Tram
 Trams in Athens

Road transport in Athens 

Road transport in Athens
 Bus transport in Athens
 Highways in Athens
 Motorways in Athens
 A1/E75 N – connects Athens to Lamia, Larissa, and Thessaloniki
 A8 (GR-8A)/E94 W – connects Athens to Elefsina, Corinth, and Patras
 A6 – connects Athens westward to Elefsina, and eastward to Athens International Airport
 National roads in Athens
 GR-1 Ν – connects Athens to Lamia, Larissa, and Thessaloniki
 GR-8 W – connects Athens to Corinth and Patras
 GR-3 N – connects Athens to Elefsina, Lamia, and Larissa
 Streets in Athens

Education in Athens 

Education in Athens
 Academy of Athens
 Universities in Athens
 Athens University of Economics and Business
 Agricultural University of Athens
 National and Kapodistrian University of Athens
 National Technical University of Athens
 Panteion University
 Harokopio University of Athens
 University of Piraeus
 Athens School of Fine Arts
 University of West Attica

Healthcare in Athens 

Hospitals in Athens
 Evangelismos Hospital

See also 

 Outline of geography

References

External links 

Official
 

Historical
 EIE.gr – Page on Archaeology of the City of Athens in the National Hellenic Research Foundation website
 Rg.ancients.info/owls – Athenian owl coins
 Kronoskaf.com – Simulation of Athens in 421 BC
 Athens Museums Information – Guide with pictures, visitor comments and reviews

Travel
 Athens - The Greek National Tourism Organization
 This is Athens - The official City of Athens guide
 Athens Urban Transport Organisation

Visual
 Timelapse video of Athens Timelapse showing Athens in the Attica region
 Athens 1973
 Athens In Pictures
 Athens Photo Guide

Athens
Athens
outline